Law of the Wolf is a 1939 American Western film directed by Raymond K. Johnson and featuring Rin Tin Tin III, Dennis Moore and Luana Walters. The film was reissued in 1941 with the alternative title Law of the Wild.

It is not to be confused with The Law of the Wild, a 1934 serial starring Rin Tin Tin, Jr.

Plot

After being falsely accused of his brother Harry's murder Carl Pearson escapes from prison with the aid of another prisoner Duke Williams. Meanwhile, wealthy aircraft manufacturer Roger Morgan makes plans to adopt Harry's son Bobby who is currently in the care of Ruth Adams, who is also Carl's fiancee. With his father dead young Bobby is the legal owner of valuable aircraft plans that Morgan wants to acquire. Carl's son is Johnny who is the owner of Rinty a prize tracking dog. The Police borrow Rinty in order to try to track Carl and Duke; but Rinty is less than cooperative in this effort. After a car accident leaves Ruth temporarily incapacitated, young Bobby wanders off. A canoe rescue and an encounter with a wild cougar follow. Arriving at the Pearson's cabin Carl recovers the plans, but Duke steals them in order to sell them. Eventually everyone else ends up at the cabin and the real killer is revealed. The killer tries to escape followed by Carl and Rinty in a climactic chase.

Cast 
Dennis Moore as Carl Pearson
Luana Walters as Ruth Adams
George Chesebro as Duke Williams
Steve Clark as John Andrews
Jack Ingram as Roger Morgan
Robert Frazer as Lt. Franklin
Jimmy Aubrey as Uncle Jim
Martin Spellman as Johnny
Robert Gordon as Bobby [Pearson]
Rin Tin Tin III as Rinty

References

Bibliography
 Pitts, Michael R. Western Film Series of the Sound Era. McFarland, 2009.

External links 
 
 

1939 films
1939 Western (genre) films
1939 crime drama films
American black-and-white films
Films about dogs
American Western (genre) films
Films directed by Raymond K. Johnson
American crime drama films
Rin Tin Tin
1930s English-language films
1930s American films